Edward Perry (15 November 1800 – 2 March 1869), was an English tinplate works master and twice Mayor of Wolverhampton.

Early life
Edward Perry was born on 15 November 1800 in Wolverhampton, to Richard Perry and Sarah. He attended Wolverhampton Grammar School.

Tin plate
After leaving school he became a japanner, eventually leaving to set up his own company. The business quickly outgrew its site and moved to new premises. Perry built up a very successful tin plate works that grew faster and larger than the similar business, Richard Perry & Son, created by his father and brother. Following his death, his business was absorbed into the other family firm, eventually becoming part of John Marston's Sunbeam works.

Politics
He was twice elected Mayor of Wolverhampton, 1855—1856 and 1856—1857, during a period of dispute between the Council and the Wolverhampton Waterworks Company which had left the Council with a considerable deficit. He organised a voluntary rate collection to resolve the situation.

He was mainly responsible for the creation of the Wolverhampton Chamber of Commerce.

Later life
Perry lived with his wife Sophia at Stonley House, Wolverhampton, then Danes Court, Tettenhall, Staffordshire. He died on 2 March 1869.

References

1800 births
1869 deaths
Mayors of Wolverhampton
People from Wolverhampton
People educated at Wolverhampton Grammar School
English industrialists
People of the Victorian era
19th-century English businesspeople